Florence Iweta (born 29 March 1983) is a Nigerian former football defender who played for the Nigeria women's national football team. She represented Nigeria  at the 2000 Summer Olympics.

See also
 Nigeria at the 2000 Summer Olympics

References

External links
 

1983 births
Living people
Nigerian women's footballers
Place of birth missing (living people)
Women's association football defenders
Nigeria women's international footballers
1999 FIFA Women's World Cup players
2003 FIFA Women's World Cup players